Banting is a town and the seat of Kuala Langat District, Selangor, Malaysia. Banting has a population of 93,497. The postal code for Banting is 42700 and is administered by the Zone of 15 and 19 of the Kuala Langat Municipal Council. It is situated on the banks of Langat River (Sungai Langat in Malay). It is a Rest Town or Bandar Persinggahan of Federal Route 5. The historical Jugra, a former royal town of Selangor is situated near Banting. 
Banting is located near the beaches of Morib, as well as hills, forest and farms. Banting is an agricultural hub. Its main agricultural resources include oil palm plantations, poultry farms, betel leaves and it has a number of industrial areas. It is also the home town of the Malaysian badminton player Rashid Sidek.

Historical Places
Among the places, popular in Banting are:
Jugra  - former Selangor's Capital (ibu negeri) before Kuala Lumpur - Sultan Abdul Samad ibni Almarhum Tengku Abdullah
Bandar Temasha - former Sultan of Selangor Royal Town - Sultan Alaeddin Sulaiman Syah ibni Almarhum Raja Muda Musa- the place of birth Sultan Salahuddin Abdul Aziz Shah ibni Almarhum Sultan Hisamudin Alam Syah

Schools
Among the schools, colleges and others institution in Banting are:

Primary schools
 Sekolah Kebangsaan Permatang Pasir
 Sekolah Kebangsaan Bandar 
 Sekolah Kebangsaan Sungai Buaya
 Sekolah Kebangsaan Pulau Carey
 Sekolah Kebangsaan Seri Lanang, Kelanang
 Sekolah Jenis Kebangsaan (C) Kah Wah
 Sekolah Kebangsaan Sri Langat (Integ)
 Sekolah Kebangsaan Kampong Busut Asli
 Sekolah Kebangsaan Jugra
 Sekolah Kebangsaan Kanchong Tengah
 Sekolah Kebangsaan Sungai Lang
 Sekolah Kebangsaan Morib
 Sekolah Jenis Kebangsaan (C) Tg Sepat
 Sekolah Kebangsaan Batu Laut
 Sekolah Kebangsaan (Asli) Bukit Cheding
 Sekolah Jenis Kebangsaan (T) Pusat Telok Datok
 Sekolah Jenis Kebangsaan (T) Sungai Sedu
 Sekolah Jenis Kebangsaan (T) Ladang Jugra
 Sekolah Jenis Kebangsaan (C) Tiong Nam
 Sekolah Kebangsaan Bukit Changgang
 Sekolah Kebangsaan Olak Lempit
 Sekolah Kebangsaan Bukit Tadom
 Sekolah Jenis Kebangsaan (C) Simpang Morib
 Sekolah Jenis Kebangsaan (C) Choong Hua
 Sekolah Kebangsaan Methodist
 Sekolah Kebangsaan Telok Panglima Garang
 Sekolah Kebangsaan Sijangkang
 Sekolah Kebangsaan Kg. Medan
 Sekolah Jenis Kebangsaan (C) Jenjarom
 Sekolah Kebangsaan Jenjarom
 Sekolah Kebangsaan Saujana Putera

Secondary schools
 Sekolah Menengah Kebangsaan Banting
 Sekolah Menengah Kebangsaan Telok Datok
 Sekolah Agama Menengah Tinggi Tengku Ampuan Rahimah, Sg. Manggis (SAMTTAR)
 Sekolah Agama Menengah Unwanus Saadah, Kanchong Darat (SAMUSKD)
 Sekolah Menengah Kebangsaan Jugra
 Sekolah Menengah Kebangsaan Bandar Banting
 Sekolah Menengah Kebangsaan Jenjarom
 Sekolah Menengah Kebangsaan Telok Panglima Garang
 Sekolah Menengah Kebangsaan Batu Laut
 Sekolah Menengah Methodist
 Sekolah Menengah Kebangsaan Sungai Manggis 

International School:
 Victoria International School, Banting (VIS)

Fully Residential School:
 Sekolah Menengah Sains Banting

College:
 Kolej Vokasional Sultan Abdul Samad, Banting
 Kolej Komuniti Kuala Langat, Banting
 College MCS, Bandar Sg. Emas, Banting Selangor http://mcs.edu.my

Fully Residential College:
 Kolej Matrikulasi Selangor

Polytechnic
 Politeknik Banting

Other Institutions
 Institut Kemahian Belia Negara(IKBN) Kuala Langat, Banting
 Institut Latihan & Perindustrian (ILP) Banting

Notable People from Banting or Kuala Langat District 
DYMM Sultan Salahuddin Abdul Aziz Shah ibni Almarhum Sultan Hisamudin Alam Syah, 11th King of Malaysia (26 April 1999 - 21 November 2001) and late Sultan Of Selangor
Misbun Sidek, former badminton player
Razif Sidek, former badminton player
Jailani Sidek, former badminton player
Rahman Sidek, former badminton player
Rashid Sidek, former badminton player
Thamil Arasu Ambumamee, footballer
Zulfahmi Khairuddin, motorcycle racer

Image gallery

References

Kuala Langat District
Towns in Selangor